Songjiatang Subdistrict ( is a subdistrict in Shaodong, Hunan, China.

History
It was upgraded to a subdistrict in April 2011.

Administrative division
As of 2017, the subdistrict is divided into five communities and fifteen villages: 
Hehua
Gongyuanlu
Guangchang
Xinhui
Xinputai
Paotang
Maizikou
Qiutian
Tantang
Liuqiao
Qinglongguan
Songjiatang
Jinquan
Ruantang
Saitian
Hutang
Tanshanpu
Zhimu
Gaotang
Fenshui'ao

Transport
Shaodong railway station serves the subdistrict.

References

Divisions of Shaodong